Deshiishe is a Somali clan. It's part of the Darod Harti sub-clan. Primarily inhabit in Puntland especially Bari, karkaar and Sanaag regions. Clan members are also found in Kismanyo in southern Somalia. The clan is a founding and pioneering tribe of Bosaso and naturally based the area of the city, its environs and constituencies.

Overview
Clan's head elder serves as nominal Ugas of harti clans.

Maps and statement Carto Corresettee and Gulio Baladccia, the earlier Italian explorers who visited in Banderqasim during 1906-1909 and the subsequent colonial administration who put Dishiishe at the top of the tribe list who inhibit in Bosaso." In particular the Italian explorer Giulio Baldacci who travelled along Somali coasts in 1906-1909 said).

"About  hours' walk from Bet Nur, we came to Bander Kasnin (also called by the Arabs: the native name is Bosaso), which was built about sixty years ago, the Kaptallah (a seafaring tribe, now almost extinct) being the first to build few huts there. They were joined by, not long after, by the Deshishe"

Dishishe forms part of Mora’ase clan also known (Ahmed Harti) they are the largest clan within Mora’ase of Darod.

References

External links
Dishiishe genealogy

Darod
Somali clans